Sean or Shawn Williams may refer to:
Sean Williams (author) (born 1967), Australian author
Sean Williams (basketball) (born 1986), American basketball player
Sean Williams (cricketer) (born 1986), Zimbabwean all-rounder
Sean Williams (ethnomusicologist) (born 1959), American college professor
Sean Williams (ice hockey) (born 1968), Canadian ice hockey center
Sean Price Williams, American cinematographer
Shawn Williams (lacrosse) (born 1974), Canadian lacrosse player
Shawn Williams (American football) (born 1991), American football player
Shawn Williams, 7-year-old child murdered in 1993. Colin Hatch was convicted for the murder

See also
Shaun Williams (disambiguation)
Shawne Williams (born 1986), American basketball player